RSIS may refer to:

 Ramsar Sites Information Service, a database of sites governed by the Ramsar Convention
 S Rajaratnam School of International Studies, a section of Nanyang Technological University

See also
 RSI (disambiguation)